In computing, legacy mode is a state in which a computer system, component, or software application behaves in a way that is different from its standard operation in order to support older software, data, or expected behavior. It differs from backward compatibility in that an item in legacy mode will often sacrifice newer features or performance, or be unable to access data or run programs it normally could, in order to provide continued access to older data or functionality. Sometimes it can allow newer technologies that replaced the old to emulate them when running older operating systems.

Examples
 x86-64 processors can be run in one of two states: long mode provides larger physical address spaces and the ability to run 64-bit applications which can use larger virtual address spaces and more registers, and legacy mode. These processors' legacy mode allows these processors to act as if they were 16- or 32-bit x86 processors with all of the abilities and limitations of them in order to run legacy 16-bit and 32-bit operating systems, and to run programs requiring virtual 8086 mode to run in Windows.
 32-bit x86 processors themselves have two legacy modes: real mode and virtual 8086 mode. Real mode causes the processor to mostly act as if it was an original 8086, while virtual 8086 mode allows the creation of a virtual machine to allow the running of programs that require real mode in order to run under a protected mode environment. Protected mode is the non-legacy mode of 32-bit x86 processors and the 80286.
 Most PC graphic cards have a VGA and a SVGA mode that allows them to be used on systems that have not loaded the device driver necessary to take advantage of their more advanced features.
 Operating systems often have a special mode allowing them to emulate an older release in order to support software applications dependent on the specific interfaces and behavior of that release.  Windows XP can be configured to emulate Windows 2000 and Windows 98; Mac OS X can support the execution of Mac OS 9 applications on PowerPC-based Macintoshes.
 Computer buses emulated through legacy mode:
 Emulated bus (Host bus)
 ISA (LPC)
 PCI (PCI Express)
 PS/2 or RS-232 mouse (USB mouse)
 PS/2 or AT keyboard (USB keyboard)
 Many SATA disk controllers offer a legacy mode of operation for compatibility i.e. parallel ATA emulation
 Some niche markets have enabled Compact Flash and SD cards to emulate IDE hard drives for old DOS and Windows 95 computers.
 The Wii U can be run in a special "Wii Mode" that activates an emulated version of the Wii Menu as a means of playing games made for the latter system (it is not compatible with GameCube games without system modification, however).

See also
 Dongle
 Legacy system
 Backward compatibility
 Compatibility mode

Backward compatibility
Legacy hardware
Legacy systems